Naadodigal is a 2009 Indian Tamil-language action drama film written and directed by Samuthirakani and produced by S. Michael Rayappan under banner of Global Infotainment. The film stars Sasikumar along with Vijay Vasanth and Bharani, while Ananya and Abhinaya made their debut in Tamil and Malaysia-based Shanthini Deva enacting the lead female roles and Ganja Karuppu playing a pivotal role, providing comical relief.

The plot focuses on a trio who attempt to unite their friend with his lover against the wishes of all families involved, and at heavy cost to themselves, only to realize that the lovers separate after a short while.

Cinematography was handled by S. R. Kathir, songs composed and score by Sundar C Babu, editing done by A. L. Ramesh, stunt co originated by Dhilip Subbarayan, dance choreography Dinesh, produced designed by R. K. Vijay Murugan and lyrics written by Vaali, Na. Muthukumar, Kabilan and Yugabharathi.

The film released in June 2009, garnering highly positive reviews. The film was a blockbuster. The film spawned a namesake sequel, Nadodigal 2, which released in 2020.

Plot
The film revolves around Karuna, alias Karunakaran Natraj (Sasikumar), Paandi (Bharani), and Chandran (Vijay Vasanth). The trio eat, sleep, and party together in Rajapalayam. They also have their individual ambitions in life. Karuna is a history graduate and a university rank holder, although his father Natraj (L. Raja) sometimes ridicules the value of his degree, B.A. History, as many colleges do not even offer such a course anymore. Despite this, his father, mother, grandmother, and sister love him dearly and view him as a source of inspiration for their family. Karuna is in love with the daughter of a distant relative, Nallammal (Ananya). He is madly pursuing a government job because Nallamal's father will agree to the marriage only if he obtains one. Paandi (who is often discriminated at home by his father to appease Pandi's step-mother,) is desperate to go abroad and get rich, while Chandran, who is working as a software teacher, is committed to start a computer center and in love with Pavithra (Abhinaya), Karuna's sister. Chandran's father is a widowed army veteran and is all decent to help his son's love.

All goes well until Saravanan (Ranga), Karuna's childhood friend from Kanyakumari, arrives in town. The son of a former MP and a prominent politician, he is in love with Prabha (Shanthini Devi), the daughter of a rich bigwig Pazhanivelraman (Jayaprakash) in Namakkal. Shocked by Saravanan's suicide attempt due to love failure, the trio promise to help him out and unite the two lovers. They set out to Namakkal where they enlist the help of their friend Maariyappan (Ganja Karuppu).

The trio manage to help the couple get married by abducting the girl while she is visiting the famous anjaneya temple with her family. In ensuing fracas between the two families, Karuna gets scarred near one of his eyes; Paandi is hit on the ear by a pipe, thereby becoming deaf; and Chandran loses his leg due to an injury by falling under a passing truck. Palanivelraman, on realizing who aided his ward escape, sends his goons to attack Karuna's family. It ends with Karunakaran's grandmother being killed.

During the funeral, the family members have a fight due to Karuna being arrested, hence hindering his ambition of obtaining a government job. Nallammal's father insults Karuna, angering Natraj and Karuna's mother. Natraj angrily tells him that anything Karuna does will always be correct and that he is proud of Karuna for the man he is. Nallammal's father questions his daughter's loyalty, as she wants to marry Karuna as well, and she breaks down, and he realizes she is still hoping for Karuna to be her husband. Nallammal's father angrily leaves and says she can have Karuna, but after he is dead, hanging himself from a fan in their house in front of Nallammal and her mother, before being let down by the help of their neighbors. This results in Karuna's fiancé Nallammal being coaxed by her parents to give up on him, and marry a better suitor. Nallammal sadly follows her father's orders to stay away from Karunakaran and that should she ever be seen speaking to him, she would never see her father alive again.

The three friends end up being put in jail and getting entangled in a kidnapping case. However, they are released as time goes by. After slowly experiencing hell upon return to their native town, they begin working alongside a local wedding food caterer and eventually begin to adjust to their new lifestyle.

Pandi leaves his house and even though his father insults him publicly, Pandi cannot hear anything being said. After being hit by his father, Pandi tells him that he always loved him, but he couldn't be the son his father wanted to be. Pandi's father realizes his selfishness and feels saddened at this and tries to call Pandi back, but Pandi cannot hear him, and simply walks away despite his father's cries to come back home.

Chandran's father laments for his son losing his leg, but tells him to stay strong as he can still come up in life. When Pavithra walks in to see him, she sobs at his lost leg and inability to walk, and Chandran's father goes out of everyone's sight and breaks down at his son's fate, but still stands by his son to succeed in life.

Karuna returns home and is traumatized, as he lost his beloved grandmother, and the entire family laments for his pain and efforts. His father tells him, whatever he did was fine, but he has to give up on Nallammal due to her father's behavior at the funeral. Karuna, heartbroken, agrees and decides to work as the caterer's aid, helping with cooking and serving. His family, albeit supportive, lament for him.

One day, Karuna's fiancé's wedding is announced, and they are told to serve food there. Karuna is shattered, and Pandi goes to the fiancé's house and wreaks havoc with her father, reprimanding the entire family, telling them that no man on the earth is as good as Karuna. He questions Nallammal about her loyalties and she looks at her father. When Nallammal's father is silent during Pandi's rage, he realizes that Nallammal's father threatened to hang himself, hence the reason why Nallammal stopped talking to Karunakaran. He threatens to kill the father, saying that him being alive is not beneficial to anyone. Pandi nearly succeeds, until Karuna rushes to stop him, and reasons with him. Karuna slowly becomes depressed afterwards, as the girl he loved so much is going to marry another man due to her father's adamancy.

Pavithra's love with Chandran is caught by her parents, for which she is shouted at and hit by them, but Karuna stops them and advises them to allow her to marry Chandran, since he was unable to marry the girl of his choice. Despite some hesitation, both parents relent, making everyone happy. Pandi has a hearing aid implanted in his ear and can hear again, while Chandran uses a prosthetic leg to be able to walk again, albeit with Pavithra's and his father's support. Life slowly begins looking up for the trio after a very long time, with Karuna also letting go of his past love for Nallammaal.

Eventually, the case filed upon the trio is withdrawn, and they find out through Karuna's uncle who helped them with the star-crossed lovers that they had managed to unite. Such great personal and emotional losses have gone their separate ways, having grown bored of each other and sex. They realize the battle they fought did not serve any purpose. They also learn that Saravana and his ex-wife are planning for their respective second marriages. Furious, the trio go to Kaniyakumari, to talk sense to Saravana. All of them are ridiculed and rebuffed without remorse. They gather again and prepare to kidnap Saravana and the girl. Pandi and Chandran go to Namakkal and kidnap her, while Karuna goes back and kidnaps Saravana. The trio bring them to a desolated forest area and whip them black and blue. Karuna then tells them to reconsider their live together, so that their sacrifices don't go in vain.

The trio then go to a tea stall, where they overhear another man trying to group people to help his friend's love and these guys volunteer.

Cast

 Sasikumar as Karunakaran Natraj aka Karuna
 Vijay Vasanth as Chandran Karuppiah
 Bharani as Pandi Azhagusundaram
 Ananya as Nallammal
 Abhinaya as Pavithra Natraj
 Ganja Karuppu as Mariyappan
 Ranga as Saravanan
 Shantini Theva as Prabha Pazhanivelraman
 Jayaprakash as Pazhanivelraman
 Lakshmi Ramakrishnan as Karunakaran's mother
 Prabha as Saravanan's Mother/Kanyakumari Ex-MP
 Namo Narayana as Chinnamani
 L. Raja as Natraj Veerabhadran (Karuna's father)
 Gopal as Sudalai Nallammal's father
 Ravi Venkatraman

Production
Samuthirakani approached Jai to play one of the lead roles, while the duo worked together on Subramaniapuram (2008). The actor however opted to work on different projects at the time.

Soundtrack
The film score and soundtrack for Naadodigal was composed by Sundar C Babu. The song Sambho Siva Sambho was later used in the Hindi remake Rangrezz as well, and also in Kannada remake film "Hudugaru" by V Harikrishna albeit with a little modifications. Another song in Hindi Yaaro Aisa Hai was loosely based on Ulagil Yentha Kathal

Release
The satellite rights of the film were sold to Sun TV.

Critical reception
Naadodigal opened to positive reviews. A critic from Sify gave 5/5 and wrote that "Nadodigal is not great cinema, but enjoyable and a welcome change in these hard days. It is eminently watchable." Bhamadevi Ravi of The Times of India rated the movie 3.5/5 and called the movie "a good show." Pavithra Srinivasan of Rediff gave the film 3 out of 5, calling "Naadodigal is in its realistic feel, mostly logical screenplay and cast go a long way in making it a worthwhile watch." Aravindan DI from Nowrunning.com rated the movie 3/5 stating that "The film does carry an appealing message for today's jet-age society - it's shocking yet powerful." Another reviewer Mythily Ramachandran from Nowrunning.com gave 3 out of 5 and wrote that "Nadodigal entertains and is thought provoking. Told in simple narrative style it is presented most realistically and is a treat for lovers of good cinema." A critic from Top10Cinema wrote that "as a team and a team work, Nadodigal is a definite entertainer."

Box office
The movie was in the list of 2009 Blockbusters. According to Sify, the movie was considered to be a Super Hit verdict.

Remakes
Following its success, the film was remade in Kannada, Telugu, Malayalam and Hindi. The Kannada version, titled Hudugaru is directed by Maadesh and stars Puneeth Rajkumar, Yogesh, Srinagar Kitty, Radhika Pandit, and Abhinaya. The Telugu version, titled Shambo Shiva Shambo, named after a hit song from the original film, is directed by Samuthirakani himself, and stars Ravi Teja, Allari Naresh, Siva Balaji, Priyamani, Abhinaya, Surya Teja and Sunil. The Malayalam version, titled Ithu Nammude Katha, is directed by Rakesh Kannankara, and stars Asif Ali, Abhishek, Nishan, Ananya, Nimisha Suresh, and Amala Paul. The Hindi version, titled Rangrezz, is directed by Priyadarshan, and stars Jackky Bhagnani, Vijay Verma, Amitosh Nagpal, Priya Anand, Rajpal Yadav, and Akshara Gowda.

Awards
 Filmfare Awards South
 Won: Filmfare Award for Best Film – Tamil
 Won: Filmfare Award for Best Female Debut - Abhinaya
 Nominated: Filmfare Award for Best Director - Samuthirakani
 Nominated: Filmfare Award for Best Supporting Actress - Abhinaya

 Vijay Awards
 Won: Vijay Award for Best Film
 Won: Vijay Award for Best Debut Actress - Ananya
 Won: Vijay Award for Best Supporting Actress - Abhinaya
 Won:  Vijay Award for Favourite Director - Samuthirakani
 Nominated: Vijay Award for Best Director - Samuthirakani
 Nominated: Vijay Award for Best Supporting Actor - Bharani
 Nominated: Vijay Award for Best Comedian - Ganja Karuppu
 Nominated: Vijay Award for Best Comedian - Namo Narayan
 Nominated: Vijay Award for Best Debut Actress - Abhinaya
 Nominated: Vijay Award for Best Editor - A.L.Ramesh
 Nominated: Vijay Award for Best Story, Screenplay Writer - Samuthirakani
 Nominated: Vijay Award for Best Make Up Artistes - S.A.Shanmugam
 Nominated: Vijay Award for Best Crew
 Nominated: Vijay Award for Favourite Hero - Sasikumar
 Nominated: Vijay Award for Favourite Film

 Edison Awards
 Best Introduced Playback Singer - Velmurugan

 Mirchi Music Awards
Mirchi Music Award for Mannin Kural (Male) - Velmurugan

In popular culture
The song "Sambo Siva Sambo" was parodied by Santhanam in Maanja Velu (2010).

References

External links

2009 films
2009 action drama films
Tamil films remade in other languages
Films directed by Samuthirakani
2000s Tamil-language films
Indian action drama films
2000s buddy films
Indian buddy films
Films scored by Sundar C. Babu